I Dream Too Much is an album led by trombonist Jimmy Knepper which was recorded in 1984 and released on the Italian Soul Note label.

Reception 

The Allmusic review by Michael G. Nastos simply states "All brass front line. Includes three Knepper compositions, two standards, one by Hanna".

Track listing 
All compositions by Jimmy Knepper except where noted.
 "I Dream Too Much" (Jerome Kern) – 10:05
 "Sixpence" – 6:52
 "If I Say I'm Sorry" (Roland Hanna) – 3:47
 "Under the Sun" – 7:36
 "Beholden" – 8:29
 "Bojangles of Harlem" (Kern) – 7:13

Personnel 
Jimmy Knepper – trombone
John Eckert – trumpet
John Clark – French horn
Roland Hanna – piano
George Mraz – bass
Billy Hart – drums

References 

Jimmy Knepper albums
1984 albums
Black Saint/Soul Note albums